Chloroxylenol, also known as para-chloro-meta-xylenol (PCMX), is an antiseptic and disinfectant which is used for skin disinfection, and together with alcohol for cleaning surgical instruments. It is also used within a number of household disinfectants and wound cleaners. It is thought to act by disrupting microbial cell walls and inactivating cellular enzymes, and is less effective than some other available agents. It is available as a liquid.

History 
Chloroxylenol was first made in 1927. It is on the World Health Organization's List of Essential Medicines. It is sold in a number of formulations and under a number of brand names, including Dettol.

Soon after it was created parachlorometaxylenol was then called PCMX, but this was thought to be a poor name and it was renamed Dettol. Then in 1932 it was marketed in Britain and in India. It had a white on green bottle with a white sword depicted.

Properties 
Side effects are generally few but can include skin irritation. It may be used mixed with water or alcohol. Chloroxylenol is most effective against gram-positive bacteria. It works by disruption of the cell wall and stopping the function of enzymes.

Uses 
Chloroxylenol is used in hospitals and households for disinfection and sanitation. It is also commonly used in antibacterial soaps, wound-cleansing applications and household antiseptics. Testing has shown products containing chloroxylenol effective against the SARS-CoV-2 virus and orthopoxviruses.

Side effects 
Chloroxylenol is generally slightly to moderately toxic to humans (but highly toxic for the eyes, causing severe eye irritation), is practically non-toxic to birds, and is moderately toxic to freshwater invertebrates.  It is highly toxic to fish, cats, and some amphibians and should not be used around them. It is a mild skin irritant and may trigger allergic reactions in some individuals.

Humans
Excessive exposure to chloroxylenol has the potential for causing death. It can be poisonous when swallowed and even when it is unintentionally inhaled.  A medical study in Hong Kong which analyzed 177 cases of Dettol ingestion that resulted in emergency department treatment (95% of which were intentional), concluded that "Dettol poisoning resulted in serious complications in 7% of patients, including death."

Animals 
Chloroxylenol is toxic to many animals, especially cats.  Phenolic compounds are of particular concern because cats are unable to fully metabolize them. A cat may swallow the product by licking its paws after they have come into contact with it.

In Australia, chloroxylenol spray has been shown to be lethal to cane toads, an invasive species that was introduced from Hawaii as a result of bad judgment in 1935. It had been hoped that the amphibian would control the cane beetle but it became highly destructive within the ecosystem. Spraying the disinfectant at close range has been shown to cause rapid death to toads. It is not known whether the toxins are persistent or whether they harm other Australian flora and fauna.

Owing to concerns over potential harm to other Australian wildlife species, the use of chloroxylenol as an agent for pest control was banned in Western Australia by the Department of Environment and Conservation in 2011.

References

External links 

 

Antifungals
Antiseptics
Phenols
Alkyl-substituted benzenes
Chloroarenes
World Health Organization essential medicines
Wikipedia medicine articles ready to translate